Sochocino-Badurki  is a village in the administrative district of Gmina Bulkowo, within Płock County, Masovian Voivodeship, in east-central Poland.

References

Sochocino-Badurki